Toronto Film School is a for-profit post-secondary institution based in Toronto, Ontario, Canada.  The school offers creative diploma programs in the areas of film, entertainment, fashion, design, and video games. In July 2021, Andrew Barnsley became the new President of the school. Besides full-time programs TFS offers part-time and online diploma programs.

Programs 

Toronto Film School offers the following diploma programs:

 Acting for Film, TV & the Theatre 
 Film Production 
 Writing for Film & TV 
 Video Game Design & Animation 
 Video Game Design & Development
 Fashion Design 
 Marketing for Fashion and Entertainment 
 Graphic Design & Interactive Media

Campuses 

 10 Dundas Street E., Suite 704 Toronto, ON, M5B 2G9 
 2000 Steeles Avenue W. Concord, ON, L4K 4N1 - shared space with Yorkville University
 1835 Yonge Street Toronto, ON, M4S 1X8
 415 Yonge Street, Toronto, ON, M5B 2E7

Notable alumni
 Ali Kazmi, Pakistani-Canadian film and television actor
 Zain Duraie, Jordanian director, writer and actress

References

Film schools in Canada